The Battle of Fucine Lake was fought in 89 BC between a Roman army and a rebel force during the Social War.  Lucius Porcius Cato was the leader of the Roman army at this battle.  The consul Porcius Cato was defeated and killed while storming a Marsic camp in winter or early spring.

A slingshot from the presumed battlefield with an inscription in the Venetic language that mentions a Floro Decio attests the presence of Venetic troops at this battle.

References

Fucine Lake
Fucine Lake
Fucine Lake
Marsi